Picture You Staring is the second studio album of Canadian indie group TOPS; Dazed debuted the album for streaming on August 28, 2014 before Arbutus Records released it to other formats on September 2, 2014. It was the fourth best album of 2014 according to Gorilla vs. Bear, the seventh best according to Dummy magazine, the 48th best per Stereogum, and 93rd as ranked by Crack Magazine.

References 

2014 albums
TOPS (band) albums
Arbutus Records albums